Sally, Irene and Mary may refer to:
 Sally, Irene and Mary (1925 film), an American silent comedy drama film
 Sally, Irene and Mary (1938 film), an American comedy film